The Football League play-offs for the 1998–99 season were held in May 1999, with the finals taking place at the old Wembley Stadium in London. The play-off semi-finals were played over two legs and contested by the teams who finished in 3rd, 4th, 5th and 6th place in the Football League First Division and Football League Second Division and the 4th, 5th, 6th and 7th placed teams in the Football League Third Division table. The winners of the semi-finals went through to the finals, with the winner of the matches gaining promotion for the following season.

Background
The Football League play-offs have been held every year since 1987. They take place for each division following the conclusion of the regular season and are contested by the four clubs finishing below the automatic promotion places.

In the First Division, Ipswich Town, who were aiming to return to the top flight after a 4-year absence, finished one point behind second placed Bradford City, who in turn finished 18 points behind champions Sunderland, who returned to the top flight after being relegated two seasons previously. Birmingham City, who were aiming to return to the top flight after 13 years outside the top division, finished in fourth place in the table. Watford, who were aiming to return to the top flight for the first time since 1988, finished in fifth place. Bolton Wanderers, who were aiming to return to the top flight after relegation the previous season, finished one point behind Watford in sixth place.

First Division

Semi-finals
First leg

Second leg

Ipswich Town 4–4 Bolton Wanderers on aggregate. Bolton Wanderers won on away goals.

Birmingham City 1–1 Watford on aggregate. Watford won 7–6 on penalties.

Final

Second Division

Semi-finals
First leg

Second leg

Gillingham won 2–1 on aggregate.

Manchester City won 2–1 on aggregate.

Final

Third Division

Semi-finals
First leg

Second leg

Rotherham United 0–0 Leyton Orient on aggregate. Leyton Orient won 4–2 on penalties.

Scunthorpe United won 3–2 on aggregate.

Final

External links
Football League website

 
English Football League play-offs